Landmark is a Canadian current affairs television series which aired on CBC Television in 1970.

Premise
John Kettle hosted this series concerning the natural resources industry in Canada, especially how those resources were developed with foreign financing. Segments were recorded in various Canadian and American cities and featured discussion with industry consultants.

Scheduling
This half-hour series was broadcast Sundays at 1:00 p.m. (Eastern) from 4 January to 22 February 1970.

References

External links
 

CBC Television original programming
1970 Canadian television series debuts
1970 Canadian television series endings